Joseph Renner (9 December 1858 – 10 December 1916) was a New Zealand cricketer. He played in one first-class match for Wellington in 1882/83.

See also
 List of Wellington representative cricketers

References

External links
 

1858 births
1916 deaths
New Zealand cricketers
Wellington cricketers
Cricketers from New Plymouth